The 1997 St Helens RLFC season was the 102nd season in the club's rugby league history and the second season in the Super League. Coached by Shaun McRae, the Saints competed in Super League II and finished in 3rd place, but went on to win the 1997 Challenge Cup, beating Bradford Bulls in the final for the second consecutive year.

Table

Squad

Transfers

In

Out

References

External links
Saints Heritage Society
St Helens - Rugby League Project

St Helens R.F.C. seasons
St Helens RLFC